The 1926 United States Senate election in Illinois took place on November 2, 1926.

Incumbent first-term Republican senator William B. McKinley, lost renomination in the Republican primary.

The U.S. Senate ultimately refused to seat the election's winner, Republican Frank L. Smith, due to allegations of election fraud.

Election information
The primaries and general election coincided with those for House and those for state elections. Primaries were held April 13, 1926.

Democratic primary

Candidates
George E. Brennan, chairman of the Cook County Democratic Party
James T. McDermott, former U.S. congressman
James O. Monroe, attorney and perennial candidate

Results

Republican primary

Candidates
William B. McKinley, incumbent U.S. senator
Frank L. Smith, former U.S. congressman

Results

Progressive primary

Candidates
Parley Parker Christensen, chairman of the Illinois Progressive Party and 1920 Farmer–Labor Party presidential nominee

Results

General election

Candidates
George E. Brennan (Democratic), chairman of the Cook County Democratic Party
Parley P. Christensen (Progressive), chairman of the Illinois Progressive Party and 1920 Farmer–Labor Party presidential nominee
J. Louis Engdahl (Workers (Communist)), journalist and newspaper editor, candidate for U.S. Senate in 1924 United States Senate election in Illinois
Samuel C. Irving (independent)
G. A. Jenning (Socialist Labor)
James H. Kirby (Independent Democrat)
James A. Logan	(High Life)
Morris Lynchenheim Commonwealth Land)
Hugh S. Magill (independent), former Illinois state senator and candidate for U.S. Senate in 1912
Raymond T. O’Keefe (Light Wines and Beer)	
Frank L. Smith (Republican), U.S. congressman
John T. Whitlock (Socialist)

Results

See also
1926 United States Senate elections

Notes

References

1926
Illinois
United States Senate